African Skies is an adventure drama series that aired from October 11, 1992 until April 24, 1994 on The Family Channel. It starred Catherine Bach.

Plot summary
An adventure-drama series about two male teenagers, one black and one white, living in post-Apartheid South Africa. Rory lives with his mother on a large range out in the countryside, while Jam lives with his mother while his father runs a medical clinic far away. Together, the two friends get into different adventures, often having to rely on each other to get out of trouble.

Cast
Catherine Bach as Margo Dutton
Simon James as Rory Dutton
Rouxnet Brown as Jam Mathiba
Robert Mitchum as Sam Dutton
Nakedi Ribane as Nyasa Mathiba
Raimund Harmstorf as Raimund

Episodes

Season 1 (1992–93)

Season 2 (1993–94)

External links
 

1992 American television series debuts
1994 American television series endings
1990s American drama television series
1992 Canadian television series debuts
1994 Canadian television series endings
1990s Canadian drama television series
The Family Channel (American TV network, founded 1990) original programming
English-language television shows
Television series about teenagers
Television shows set in South Africa
American adventure television series
Canadian adventure television series
Television shows filmed in Vancouver